Henrik Von Appen (born 15 December 1994 in Santiago, Chile) is an alpine skier from Chile. He competed for Chile at the 2014 Winter Olympics and 2018 Winter Olympics in all five alpine skiing events. In 2018, Henrik was Chile's flagbearer at the opening ceremony.

His cousin Kai Horwitz is an Olympic alpine skier for Chile, and his cousin Nadja Horwitz is an Olympic sailor for Chile.

World Cup results

Results per discipline

Standings through 27 January 2019

World Championship results

Olympic results

Other results

European Cup results

Season standings

Results per discipline

Standings through 15 February 2019

Nor-Am Cup results

Results per discipline

Standings through 8 February 2019

South American Cup results
Von Appen started his first South American Cup race when he was 14 years and 234 days old on 8 August 2009.

Season standings

Results per discipline

Standings through 20 September 2018

Race podiums
 1 win – (1 GS)
 4 podiums – (2 SG, 1 GS, 1 Combined|AC)

References 

1994 births
Alpine skiers at the 2014 Winter Olympics
Alpine skiers at the 2018 Winter Olympics
Alpine skiers at the 2022 Winter Olympics
Chilean male alpine skiers
Living people
Olympic alpine skiers of Chile
Sportspeople from Santiago